Walter William Langston (November 9, 1884 – April 12, 1978) He was an American football player and coach. He served as the head football coach at Southwest Missouri State Teacher's College (now known as Missouri State University) in 1909.

He was a graduate of Drury College and attended the Boston University School of Theology.

References

1884 births
1978 deaths
Boston University School of Theology alumni
Missouri State Bears football coaches
People from Springfield, Missouri